The Eudaemons were a small group headed by graduate physics students J. Doyne Farmer and Norman Packard at the University of California Santa Cruz in the late 1970s.  The group's immediate objective was to find a way to beat roulette using a concealed computer, but a loftier objective was to use the money made from roulette to fund a scientific community.  The name of the group was inspired by the eudaimonism philosophy.

History 
During a summer the two students started doing their own research on a roulette wheel which they had bought.  Using instruments including a camera and an oscilloscope to keep track of the motion of the roulette wheel, they eventually figured out a formula involving trigonometric functions and four variables, among them the period of rotation of the roulette wheel and the period of rotation of the ball around the roulette wheel.

Since the calculations were very complicated, they decided to build a computer customized for the purpose of being fed data about the roulette wheel and the ball and to return a prediction of which of the roulette wheel's octants the ball would fall on.  The computer was concealable, designed to be invisible to an onlooker.  It was small enough to fit inside a shoe.  The data was input by tapping the big toe on a micro-switch in the shoe.  Then an electronic signal was relayed to a vibrotactile output system hidden behind the shirt, strapped to the chest, which had three solenoid actuators near the stomach which would indicate by vibrating either which of the eight octants of the roulette wheel to place a bet on, or a ninth possibility: not to place a bet.

It took two years to develop the computerized system.  By 1978, it was working and the group went to Las Vegas to make money at it.  Eventually the system was split between two persons: an observer and a bettor.  The observer would tap input signals with the foot, the bettor would receive output signals underneath their shirt.  The average profit was 44% for every dollar.  However, there were problems: in one case the insulation failed and the bettor received electric shocks from the solenoids.  But she kept placing bets, so the observer, who in this case was Farmer, left the table, so that the bettor would be forced to leave as well.  Afterwards it turned out that the solenoid had burned a hole into her skin.  Some members of the group had already left because of trouble juggling the academic schedule with the Eudaemons, but the burning incident caused the two leaders to disband the group.  Collectively they had managed to make about $10,000.

As a science experiment, the group's objective was accomplished: to prove that there was a way of statistically predicting where a ball would fall in a roulette wheel given some input data. This outcome precursed data science and embodied the infancy of predictive analytics .

A previous wearable roulette computer had been built and used in a casino by Edward O. Thorp and Claude Shannon in 1960–1961, though it had only been used briefly.

Adaptations
The Eudaemon's scheme is used in the CSI: Crime Scene Investigation episode "No More Bets" of 2004.

Sources 
The Eudaemons were the feature of the 1985 book The Eudaemonic Pie by Thomas A Bass; the British version of this book was titled The Newtonian Casino.

The story of the Eudaemons was featured in 2004 on the History Channel, in episode "Beat the Wheel" of the Breaking Vegas program.

See also 
Chaos: Making a New Science
Determinism
Laplace's demon
Robert Shaw (physicist)
Data science

References

External links 
The Eudaemons
The Eudaemons' shoe computer

American gamblers
University of California, Santa Cruz